The following is a list of Mexico national football team managers,

Managers

Current as of 10 February 2023

Mexico
Mexico national football team